Beryl Spring is a hot spring in the Gibbon Geyser Basin of Yellowstone National Park in the United States. It is a large superheated pool, and boils up to a height of 4 feet.

One of the hottest springs in Yellowstone, averaging ., Beryl Spring was named by the U.S. Geological Survey Hague party in 1883 for the blue-green color which reminded a party member of the gemstone beryl.

References 

Geothermal features of Yellowstone National Park
Geothermal features of Park County, Wyoming
Hot springs of Wyoming
Bodies of water of Park County, Wyoming